Bulgaria plans to adopt the euro and become the 21st member state of the eurozone. The Bulgarian lev has been on the currency board since 1997 through a fixed exchange rate of the lev against the Deutsche Mark and the euro. Bulgaria's target date for introduction of the euro is 1 January 2025, which would make the euro only the second national currency of the country since the lev was introduced over 140 years ago. The official exchange rate is 1.95583 lev for 1 euro.

Convergence criteria 
When it joined the European Union in 2007, Bulgaria committed to switching its currency, the lev, to the euro, as stated in the 2005 EU accession treaty. The transition will occur once the country meets all the euro convergence criteria; it currently meets three of the five. As the lev was fixed to the Deutsche Mark at par, the lev's peg effectively switched to the euro on 1 January 1999, at the rate of 1.95583 leva = 1 euro, which was the Deutsche Mark's fixed exchange rate to the euro.

Bulgarian euro coins have not yet been designed, but the Madara Rider has already been selected as the motif on the obverse ("national" side) of the coins. Bulgaria officially joined the European Exchange Rate Mechanism (ERM II) on 10 July 2020. Bulgarian government and central bank officials adopted a draft national plan for euro adoption on 30 June 2021, after stating that same day Bulgaria's intention to adopt the euro on 1 January 2024. In May 2022, the government adopted a more definitive version of its euro introduction plan, reaffirming the country's commitment to adopt the euro on the target date. On 21 February 2023, Bulgaria scrapped the idea of adopting the single currency on 1 January 2024 due to internal political crisis.

The Maastricht Treaty, which Bulgaria acceded to by way of its EU accession treaty, requires that all European Union member states join the euro once certain economic criteria are met.

In November 2007, Bulgarian Finance Minister Plamen Oresharski had stated that his goal was to comply with all five convergence criteria by 2009 and adopt the euro in 2012. But Bulgaria did not comply with the requirement to be an ERM II member for at least two years, nor did it satisfy the price stability criterion in 2008. Bulgaria's inflation in the 12 months from April 2007 to March 2008 reached 9.4%, well above the reference value limit of 3.2%.

However, Bulgaria fulfilled the state budget criterion of only having a maximum deficit of 3% of the country's gross domestic product (GDP). The country had posted surpluses since 2003, which in 2007 represented 3.4% of its GDP (at the time, the EC forecast that it would remain at 3.2% of GDP in both 2008 and 2009). Bulgaria also complied with the public debt criteria. During the prior decade, the Bulgarian debt had declined from 50% of GDP to 18% in 2007, and was expected to reach 11% in 2009. Finally, the average for the long-term interest rate during the prior year was 4.7% in March 2008, well within the reference limit of 6.5%.

A 2008 analysis said that Bulgaria would not be able to join the eurozone earlier than 2015 due to the high inflation and the repercussions of the 2007–2008 global financial crisis. Some members of Bulgarian government, notably economy minister Petar Dimitrov, speculated about unilaterally introducing the euro, which was not well-met by the European Commission.

Bulgaria met three out of the five criteria in the last convergence report published by the European Central Bank in June 2022.

Joining ERM II 
The Bulgarian lev has been pegged to the euro since the latter was launched in 1999, at a fixed rate of €1 = BGN 1.95583, through a strictly managed currency board. Prior to that, the lev was pegged on par to the German Mark. While the currency board which pegs Bulgaria to the euro has been seen as beneficial to the country fulfilling criteria so quickly, the ECB has pressured Bulgaria to drop it as it did not know how to let a country using a currency board join the euro. The Bulgarian Prime Minister has stated the desire to keep the currency board until the euro was adopted. However, factors such as a high inflation, an unrealistic exchange rate with the euro and the country's low productivity are negatively affected by the system.

Simeon Dyankov, Bulgaria's then-finance minister, said in September 2009 that Bulgaria planned to enter ERM II in November, but this was delayed. It was then delayed further due to an increased budget deficit, outside the Maastricht criteria. Since 2011, Bulgaria's non-membership of the ERM has been the primary factor that prevented euro membership, as Bulgaria met the other criteria for euro adoption. In July 2011, Dyankov stated that the government would not adopt the euro as long as the European sovereign-debt crisis was ongoing. In 2011, Bulgaria's Minister of Finance Simeon Djankov stated that adoption of the euro would be postponed until the end of the eurozone crisis.

In January 2015, then-Finance Minister Vladislav Goranov (under Prime Minister Boyko Borisov) changed approaches and said that it was possible for Bulgaria to join ERM II before the government's term ended. Goranov said he would begin talks with the Eurogroup and a co-ordination council to prepare the country for eurozone membership. The council was to draft a plan for the introduction of the euro, propose a target date, and organise the preparation and coordination of the expert working groups.

This approach was supported by former Bulgarian National Bank governor Kolyo Paramov, who had been in office when the state currency board was established. Paramov argued that adoption would "trigger a number of positive economic effects":

 Sufficient money supply (leading to increased lending, which is needed to improve economic growth)
 Getting rid of the currency board that prevents the national bank from functioning as a lender of last resort to rescue banks in financial trouble
 Private and public lending benefiting from lower interest rates (at least half as high)

Former Bulgarian National Bank deputy governor Emil Harsev agreed with Paramov, stating that it was possible to adopt the euro in 2018 and that "Bulgaria's membership in the eurozone will bring only positive effect on the economy" because "since [the establishment of] the currency board in 1997, we have been accepting all the negative effects of accession into the eurozone without getting the positive ones (access to the European financial market)".

Following the reelection of Borisov's government in 2017, he declared his intention apply to join ERM II, but Goranov elaborated that the government would only seek to join once the eurozone states were ready to approve the application, and that he expected to have clarity on the matter by the end of 2017. On taking the presidency of the EU Council in January 2018, Borisov indicated no clarification had been given but announced he was going to pursue applications for both ERM II and Schengen by July 2018 regardless. Bulgaria sent a letter to the Eurogroup in July 2018 expressing its desire to join ERM II and committing to enter into a "close cooperation" agreement with the EU banking union.

In January 2019, Goranov said he hoped that Bulgaria could join the ERM II mechanism in July and introduce the euro on 1 January 2022. However, the first deadline was pushed back to July 2019 due to extra conditions requested by eurozone governments, namely that Bulgaria:
Join the banking union at the same time as ERM (meaning Bulgaria's banks must first pass stress-tests)
Reinforce supervision of the non-bank financial sector and fully implement EU anti money-laundering rules
Thoroughly implement the reforms of the Mechanism for Cooperation and Verification (CVM)

While the CVM reforms are mentioned, and progress in judicial reform and organised crime is expected, leaving the CVM is not a precondition.

As of October 2019, Goranov's target was to enter the ERM II by April 2020. In January 2020, IMF Managing Director Kristalina Georgieva said that it was possible for Bulgaria to join ERM II later in 2020 and adopt the euro in 2023. Borisov stated in February 2020 that Bulgaria's application would be reviewed in July. In March, the Bulgarian central bank said that this target was no longer realistic due to the ongoing COVID-19 pandemic. However, in April Borisov stated that he would push forward the application by the end of April. The reason he gave for this U-turn was the 500 billion euros rescue package to deal with the economic fallout of the coronavirus pandemic, which the finance ministers of the Eurogroup had agreed upon on 10 April. On 24 April, Fitch Ratings announced that they would probably upgrade Bulgaria's foreign currency issuer default ratings (IDR) between Bulgaria's accession to ERM II and euro adoption:  "… Given that the COVID-19 pandemic response is taking up significant resources with regard to political engagement at the EU-wide level, facilitating the Bulgarian lev's ERM2 accession may decline as a relative priority for European institutions. If concerns about risks ease and the process resumes, this would be supportive of the rating, as underlined by our view that all things being equal, we would upgrade Bulgaria's Long-Term Foreign-Currency IDR by two notches between admission to the ERM II and joining the euro."

On 30 April 2020, Bulgaria officially submitted documents to the European Central Bank to apply to join ERM II, the first step to introducing the euro. On 12 May, European Commission Executive Vice President Valdis Dombrovskis stated that Bulgaria could join ERM II together with Croatia in July, which both countries did on 10 July.

Joining the eurozone 
Bulgaria is in the process of joining the eurozone. On 17 February 2023, Finance Minister Rositsa Velkova announced that Bulgaria will not join the eurozone on 1 January 2024 and that the new target date for the entry into the euro area is 1 January 2025.

Status

Advantages of euro adoption 
Because the lev is pegged to the euro at a fixed exchange rate, it can be argued that Bulgaria is already a de facto member of the euro area insofar as it cannot pursue an independent monetary policy and is bound by the monetary policy and interest rate decisions of the European Central Bank, without having a say. Adopting the euro and thereby becoming a de jure member of the euro area would enhance Bulgaria's position by giving it a voice in the ECB.

Moreover, the fact that the lev is pegged to the euro at a fixed exchange rate also means that Bulgaria cannot devalue its currency in order to make its exports more competitive. Therefore, Bulgaria would not lose anything in this regard by adopting the euro.

Other advantages of adopting the euro include the improved supervision of Bulgaria's systemically important banks once it has joined ERM II together with the Banking union, and the decreased cost of borrowing and full access to the eurozone's COVID-19 pandemic rescue packages.

Selecting the design 
Bulgarian euro coins will replace the lev once the convergence criteria are fulfilled. On the occasion of the signing of the EU accession treaty on 25 April 2005, the Bulgarian National Bank issued a commemorative coin with a face value of 1.95583 leva, giving it a nominal value of exactly 1 euro.

The Madara Rider was one of the favourites to become the symbol of Bulgaria to be used on the "national" (obverse) side of the country's euro coins. Other eminent contenders to be the 'symbol of Bulgaria' were ancient traditional nestinars (Bulgarian fire dancers), Cyrillic script, the Rila Monastery and the Tsarevets medieval fortress near Veliko Turnovo.

On 17 June 2008, debates on the design of future Bulgarian euro coins were held all over the country, continuing until 29 June when a vote was held on the symbol to be used on all coins. Bulgarians voted in post offices, gas stations and schools. That same day, the winner was announced: a plurality of voters, 25.44%, had chosen the Madara Rider to be depicted on future euro coins.

Linguistic issues 

Bulgarian Cyrillic script and its non-straightforward transliteration of the word euro initially caused issues when the European Central Bank and European Commission insisted that Bulgaria adopt the name ЕУРО (i.e., euro), rather than the original ЕВРО (i.e., evro)  (from Bulgarian Европа , meaning Europe), arguing that the currency's name should be standardised across the EU as much as possible. Bulgaria maintained that its language's alphabet and phonetic orthography warranted the exception. At the 2007 EU Summit in Lisbon, the issue was decided in Bulgaria's favour, making евро the official Cyrillic spelling from 13 December 2007.

This ruling affected the design of euro banknotes. The second series of notes (beginning with the €5 note issued from 2013) includes the term "ЕВРО" and the abbreviation "ЕЦБ" (short for Европейска централна банка, the Bulgarian name of the European Central Bank). The first series only had the standard Latin alphabet "EURO" and Greek "ΕΥΡΩ".

Because euro coins only have the Latin "EURO" on their common (reverse) side, Greek coins include the Greek spelling on the national (obverse) side. Bulgarian coins may follow suit, with "EURO" on one side and "ЕВРО" on the other.

The plural of евро in Bulgarian varies in spoken language – евро, евра , еврота  – but the most widespread form is евро – without inflection in plural form. The word for euro, though, has a normal form with the postpositive definite article – еврото (the euro).

The Bulgarian word for eurocent is евроцент  and it is likely to be that or цент  that is used when the European currency is introduced in Bulgaria. In contrast to euro, the word for "cent" has a full inflection in both the definite and the plural form: евроцент (basic form), евроцентът (full definite article – postpositive), евроцентове (plural) and 2 евроцента (numerative form – after numerals). However, the name of the Bulgarian lev subunit, stotinki (стотинки), and the singular stotinka (стотинка), could be used in place of cent, as it has become a synonym of the word "coins" in colloquial Bulgarian. Just like "cent" (from Latin centum), its etymology is from a word meaning hundred – sto (сто). Stotinki is used widely in the Bulgarian diaspora in Europe to refer to subunits of currencies other than the Bulgarian lev.

Public opinion 
Public support for the euro in Bulgaria

See also 

 2007 enlargement of the European Union
 Enlargement of the eurozone

Notes

References 

Bulgaria and the European Union
Currencies of Bulgaria
Euro by country